The 6th constituency of Oise is a French legislative constituency in the Oise département.

Description

The 6th constituency of the Oise covers the north eastern corner of the department and includes the north of Compiègne.

Two men swapped control of the seat from 1988 to 2017, Patrice Carvalho of the PCF and conservative François-Michel Gonnot.

Historic Representation

Election results

2022 

 
 
 
|-
| colspan="8" bgcolor="#E9E9E9"|
|-

2017

2012

 
 
 
 
 
|-
| colspan="8" bgcolor="#E9E9E9"|
|-

Sources
Official results of French elections from 2002: "Résultats électoraux officiels en France" (in French).

6